The 1838 New York gubernatorial election was held from November 5 to 7, 1838, to elect the Governor and Lieutenant Governor of New York.

The issues of slavery and abolition were among the topics of the campaigns. Abolitionists asked the candidates for both positions their stands on the following issues:
1) "the right of blacks to a jury trial when seized as fugitive slaves;
2) a law freeing slaves-in-transit the moment they were brought into the state by their masters; and
3) equal suffrage for blacks."

Incumbent Democrat William Marcy and his running mate were described as doughfaces, not supporting the abolitionist proposals. During the campaign, Seward said that he did not support the latter two proposals, noting that a change to suffrage required a constitutional amendment to be changed. Abolitionists endorsed Luther Bradish, the Whig candidate for lieutenant governor, who supported all three, and some activists recommended voting against Seward.

But he and Bradish defeated the Democratic candidates. After election, Seward demonstrated considerable support for African Americans, signing legislation during his two terms to guarantee jury trials to alleged fugitive slaves, to repeal the nine-month allowance for slaveholders bringing slaves into the state, to give state support to efforts to gain freedom for free blacks kidnapped and sold into slavery, and establish public education for all children.

Candidates
The Whig Party nominated former state senator and 1834 gubernatorial nominee William H. Seward. They nominated state assemblyman Luther Bradish for Lieutenant Governor.

The Democratic Party nominated incumbent Governor William L. Marcy. They nominated the incumbent John Tracy for Lieutenant Governor.

Results
The Whig ticket of Seward and Bradish was elected.

References

Sources
Result: The Tribune Almanac 1841

1838
New York
Gubernatorial election
November 1838 events